The 1994 Virginia Slims of Florida was a women's tennis tournament played on outdoor hard courts at the Delray Beach Tennis Center in Delray Beach, Florida in the United States that was part of Tier II of the 1994 WTA Tour. The tournament was held from February 28 through March 6, 1994.

Finals

Singles

 Steffi Graf defeated  Arantxa Sánchez Vicario 6–3, 7–5
 It was Graf's 4th title of the year and the 94th of her career.

Doubles

 Jana Novotná /  Arantxa Sánchez Vicario defeated  Manon Bollegraf /  Helena Suková 6–2, 6–0
 It was Novotná's 1st title of the year and the 56th of her career. It was Sánchez Vicario's 1st title of the year and the 39th of her career.

External links
 ITF tournament edition details

Virginia Slims of Florida
Virginia Slims of Florida
Virginia Slims of Florida
Virginia Slims of Florida
Virginia Slims of Florida
Virginia Slims of Florida